Sally Jones is a British journalist, television news and sports presenter. She is three-times a world champion at real tennis; once in the singles and twice in the doubles.

Education 
Sally Jones was born in Coventry, Warwickshire, and educated at King Edward VI High School for Girls, Birmingham and St Hugh's College, Oxford where she read English and won five blues and half blues for different sports including tennis, squash, netball, cricket and modern pentathlon. In 1976, she was Oxford University rock n'roll champion (Oxford Rock Soc) and began tap-dancing with the Oxcentrics jazz band as well as gaining notoriety via a student prank, successfully dressing up as a man to stand for membership of the all-male Gridiron Club.

Sport 
She was Warwickshire county and British schoolgirls tennis champion (Lawn Tennis Association) and a finalist in the British Under 21 doubles championship (LTA). She played county tennis, squash (Warwickshire, Devon and South Wales squash associations), and netball (Birmingham Schools and Midlands First teams), captaining the Warwickshire senior tennis team for ten years, leading them to the County Championship in July 1997. She won the Sunday Telegraph Travel Writing Prize for an account of a tennis tour of Ireland and two Catherine Pakenham awards for women journalists.

Broadcasting and writing career 
During her career, she has been a BBC news trainee, a TV reporter at Westward TV, and a TV presenter/reporter for HTV (Wales) where she also made several documentaries, and Central TV in Birmingham where she co-presented Central News and reported on the politics show Central Lobby. She has also reported for ITN and Channel 4 News and has written columns for theDaily Telegraph, Daily Mirror and Today newspapers. In 1986, she became the BBC's first woman sports presenter on BBC Breakfast News and presented for BBC Sport during the Seoul summer Olympic Games in 1988 and for BBC World during the 1992 Summer Olympics.

She has presented other TV and radio programmes, including several series of On the Line, the daytime show The Garden Party, real tennis documentaries for Channel 4, coverage of women's British Open golf, international tennis, women's rugby and NBA basketball (BBC TV), Transworld Sport (Channel 4) and international gymnastics (ITV). She regularly presented Woman's Hour from Birmingham (BBC Radio 4) and was a member of the Radio Five Live Wimbledon tennis commentary team during the 1990s. In 2010, she set up Sally Jones Features Ltd, a media consultancy.

Real tennis 
In 1986, she took up real tennis and won the world championship at Bordeaux in 1993 (Ladies Real Tennis Association), as well as two British Open and two US Open championships. She won the world doubles championships with Alex Garside in 1989 and 1991 and was British Open doubles finalist with Jo Iddles in 2008.

Personal life 
She married civil engineer John Grant in 1989 and has two children, management consultant Roland Grant and Daily Telegraph columnist Madeline Grant. She has written four books on West-country legends and several on sport, including the Ladybird Book of Riding. In 2006, she co-wrote and edited a prize-winning local history book on Georgian Warwickshire. She works for several charities including Birmingham Children's Hospital and Twycross Zoo She is a board member of Modern Pentathlon GB and a trustee of the Oxford and Cambridge Rowing Foundation.

A quiz enthusiast, she won Sale of the Century aged 18 and has since appeared on celebrity editions of Fifteen to One and The Krypton Factor. She has appeared five times on Mastermind and reached the semi-finals in 2008.

References 

1954 births
Alumni of St Hugh's College, Oxford
English journalists
English real tennis players
English sportswomen
English television presenters
Living people
People educated at King Edward VI High School for Girls, Birmingham
People from Coventry
Oxcentrics members